"A Life of Illusion" is a song written by the American singer-songwriter and multi-instrumentalist Joe Walsh and guitarist Kenny Passarelli, which became a hit and one of Walsh's most recognizable songs. It appears as the fifth track on Walsh's 1981 album, There Goes the Neighborhood. The majority of the track was originally recorded in 1973 as part of The Smoker You Drink, The Player You Get sessions.

Release
The song was a hit in the United States, peaking at #34 on the Billboard Hot 100, and also reaching #1 on the magazine's Top Tracks chart, where his former bandmates Don Henley and Glenn Frey would also score #1 hits.

Reception
Record World said that "Walsh s existential lyrics wind into a great hook." Record World also praised Passarelli's [guitarrón]] playing on the song.

Chart history

Cover versions
In 2002, the Foo Fighters recorded a cover of the song as a B-side, which later appeared on their covers album Medium Rare in 2011.

In popular culture
The song is used as the musical background to the opening scene in the film The 40-Year-Old Virgin, and appears as the first track on the soundtrack album. The song is also referenced in author Rick Riordan's The Burning Maze, the third book in The Trials of Apollo series.

See also
List of Billboard Mainstream Rock number-one songs of the 1980s

References

1981 singles
Joe Walsh songs
1981 songs
Songs written by Joe Walsh
Asylum Records singles
Songs written by Kenny Passarelli